The 34th British Academy Film Awards, given by the British Academy of Film and Television Arts in 1981, honoured the best films of 1980.

There are no records, and no explanation, showing any nominations nor winner for the BAFTA Award for Best Actor in a Supporting Role and BAFTA Award for Best Actress in a Supporting Role at this 34th film ceremony.

Winners and nominees

 BAFTA Fellowship: Abel Gance, Emeric Pressburger and Michael Powell
 BAFTA Outstanding British Contribution to Cinema Award: Kevin Brownlow

Statistics

See also
 53rd Academy Awards
 6th César Awards
 33rd Directors Guild of America Awards
 38th Golden Globe Awards
 1st Golden Raspberry Awards
 7th Saturn Awards
 33rd Writers Guild of America Awards

1980 film awards
1981 in British cinema
Film034
1980 awards in the United Kingdom